This list of tallest buildings in Nebraska ranks skyscrapers in the US state of Nebraska by height for existing and proposed structures, including towers for Woodmen of the World and the First National Bank of Omaha.

As of April 2022, Mutual of Omaha announced they would build their new headquarters in downtown Omaha on the site of the W. Dale Clark Library, with the 44 story, 677 ft. height making it the new tallest building in Omaha and Nebraska.

Tallest buildings

Timeline of tallest buildings
The following is a list of buildings that were once the tallest structure in Nebraska.

See also
 List of tallest buildings in Omaha, Nebraska
 Mutual of Omaha Headquarters Tower

References 

Nebraska

Tallest